Lee Moon is an American former college football coach and athletics administrator. Following the resignation of Jim Dickey, Moon served as the interim head football coach at Kansas State University during the 1985 football season, posting a record of 1–8. Moon later served as athletic director at Marshall University, the University of Wyoming, and the University of North Florida.

Head coaching record

Notes

References

Year of birth missing (living people)
Living people
Duke Blue Devils football coaches
Kansas State Wildcats football coaches
Marshall Thundering Herd athletic directors
Mississippi State Bulldogs football coaches
North Florida Ospreys athletic directors
Virginia Cavaliers football coaches
VMI Keydets football players
Wyoming Cowboys and Cowgirls athletic directors